The 1999–2000 season was the 76th season in the existence of AEK Athens F.C. and the 41st consecutive season in the top flight of Greek football. They competed in the Alpha Ethniki, the Greek Cup, the UEFA Champions League and the UEFA Cup. The season began on 7 August 1999 and finished on 27 May 2000.

Overview

From the middle of previous season, Dimitris Melissanidis had taken over the management of the team again and had been credited the success of the entrance to the Champions League qualifiers. Melissanidis decided to follow the example of Dušan Bajević's success and addressed the Serbian market to build the new AEK of titles. The upcoming Serbian coach Ljubiša Tumbaković from Partizan arrived at AEK and brought with him Matijašević, Petrić and Bjeković. The highlight was the loan of Dragan Ćirić from Barcelona, which raised a storm of excitement in the AEK fans, who rushed to the airport to welcome him.

The season started with great enthusiasm, title expectations and a draw in the Champions League qualifiers that gave AEK the assurance of qualifying at the group stage, therefore financial independency and self-sufficiency. Tumbaković however did not start well, he lost both of the derbies from Panathinaikos and Olympiacos, as a result of which, the protests of the fans started early. Already after the exclusion from the Champions League, it was a common secret that Melissanidis left the management, a fact that Petros Stathis kept as secret as possible, before the multinational owners of the team took the matter into their hands and appoint the first foreigner president in history of the club, Cornelius Sierhuis. As if this were not enough, at the beginning of September a big earthquake took place in Parnitha and damaged part of Nikos Goumas Stadium, which was deemed unsuitable for fans, being dangerous for their physical integrity. AEK were forced to play most of their home mathces at Nea Smyrni Stadium.

In the competitive part, Tumbaković brought irrational results and the patience was starting to run out at the end of December. After a home defeat by Panionios, Tumbaković could no longer remain on the bench of AEK, since he was left out of the UEFA Cup. Among others, his transfers proved to be mediocre, Ćirić did not live up to the expectations around his reputation. The situation brought Takis Karagiozopoulos as an interim coach and immediately after Giannis Pathiakakis on the team's bench, with the entire organization of AEK considering the season wasted. Pathiakakis raised the psychology of the divided team, but also lost the derbies. AEK finished in 3rd place, far from the first two places.

Amidst an atmosphere of excitement and a new beginning for the UEFA Champions League, AEK were drawn against the very passable Sweedish AIK. The team of Tumbaković was not presented themselves ready for the first leg at Nikos in August and the Swedish champions left with a valuable 0–0 draw. Tumbaković had assured that the team would be more ready in the rematch. Indeed, AEK were more offensive and created chances, but an inactivity of Atmatsidis at the 57th minute, costed them the presence in the group stage. AIK, despite being outsiders, managed to qualify after withstanding the pressure of AEK at the end, when even Dellas stepped up to the attack and played as a center forward. Thus, AEK was contunued to the UEFA Cup.

The disappointed AEK, draw with Torpedo Kutaisi from Georgia. In a bad match at Ramaz Shengelia Stadium, the yellow-blacks again showed up unmotivated, but got the victory in the end of the match thanks to a Zikos goal. The rematch was a chance to cool off against a very easy opponent. However, the only 5,000 fans were in Nea Smyrni to watch the comfortable and satisfying 6–1 against the Georgians. Next stop for AEK was the Hungarian MTK Budapest. Despite this, AEK put in a poor performance at the Hidegkuti Nándor Stadium and were stymied by Henk ten Cate's complex tactical ploys. Fortunately After Ćirić equalized midway through the second half and a nightmarish 2–0 half-time, turned into an attractive 2–1, a scoreline that could easily be overturned in Athens. The rematch in Nea Smyrni almost turned out to be a nightmare for AEK, since the well-prepared MTK, playing hard, managed to stress AEK before Ćirić redeemed himself with a penalty again, fifteen minutes before the end of the game and qualification was lost. Eventually AEK entered the draw for the third round of the UEFA Cup. In the third round, AEK came acrpss an old acquaintance, Monaco. On 23 November in an initially difficult match and finally, Monaco with the help of the referee, left Nea Filadelfeia with the precious 2–2. In Louis De's second leg, AEK were as good as in the first game, they fought, they created the chances that given them the qualification, but a bad calculation by Atmatsidis, brought the goal by Simone just after half an hour. The rest of the game flowed with AEK trying to equalize and Monaco limiting themselves to drugged counter-attacks to seal qualification. In the end, the 1–0 remained, despite the sensational play of Dellas and Nikolaidis. With this unfair exclusion, AEK exited to the European Cups and the new millennium found them participating only in domestic competitions.

In the Cup, AEK were drawn in the 8th group of the Cup with Trikala, Egaleo, Athinaikos, Akratitos and A.O. Karditsa and finished first with winning all their matches. They passed through the round of 32 without opponent in the round of 16 came across Trikala again, which  won again with 6–0. The draw for the quarter-finals found AEK against Olympiacos. Olympiacos welcomes AEK at Olympic Stadium, already having a difference of 20 points in the league and everyone expected an easy night for the red and whites. Strict security measures were taken, but the game as usual in these cases went smoothly. AEK opened the score with an amazing goal by Vasilis Lakis and then accepted the pressure of Olympiacos, which bore fruit in the 75th minute when Alexandris also equalized to make the final 1–1. After 21 nights, Nea Filadelfeia was on fire, AEK and their people are "thirsty" to restore the injustice and on the evening of March 8, Olympiacos were scattered, losing already by the 48th minute by 3–0. There was delirium in the stands and the yellow-black party just ended in the second half. The semi-finals with Panionios was of a standard procedure, as the final itself was expected to be. Panionios didn't last a single half in Nea Filadelfeia, already losing 3–0, to finally close the score in the honorary 4–1 for the club of Nea Smyrni. The rematch was very quickly forgotten, after AEK cut off from the 22nd minute any thought of a comeback with a goal from Ćirić and Panionios simply indulged in the hunt for a victory for the honor of the weapons, which he won with two goals in the end. AEK were in the final where they faced Ionikos. On 10 May at the Olympic Stadium, where 35,000 AEK fans rushed to celebrate the expected conquest of the title. Ionikos put up a relatively strong resistance and until the 76th minute maintained the fluid 1–0 that has already been formed since the 37th minute by a goal Nikolaidis. Two goals by Petkov and Maladenis followed and AEK won the Cup amidst celebrations and emotion from the "rookie" in titles, Pathiakakis. Highlights of the match included the fair play move by Nikolaidis, who after scoring a goal with his hand, asked the referee to disallow it, which led the International Olympic Committee to award him for his sportsmanship.

Demis Nikolaidis who seemed to "woke up" in the second half of the season, completed it with 22 league goals, which was perhaps the second positive element of the season after winning the Cup, since the team did not manage to win any derby.

Players

Squad information

NOTE: The players are the ones that have been announced by the AEK Athens' press release. No edits should be made unless a player arrival or exit is announced. Updated 30 June 2000, 23:59 UTC+3.

Transfers

In

Summer

Winter

Out

Summer

Winter

Loan in

Summer

Winter

Loan out

Summer

Renewals

Overall transfer activity

Expenditure
Summer:  ₯950,000,000

Winter:  ₯260,000,000

Total:  ₯1,210,000,000

Income
Summer:  ₯100,000,000

Winter:  ₯250,000,000

Total:  ₯350,000,000

Net Totals
Summer:  ₯850,000,000

Winter:  ₯10,000,000

Total:  ₯860,000,000

Pre-season and friendlies

Alpha Ethniki

League table

Results summary

Results by Matchday

Fixtures

Greek Cup

Group 8

Matches

Round of 16

Quarter-finals

Semi-finals

Final

UEFA Champions League

Third qualifying round

UEFA Cup

First round

Second round

Third round

Statistics

Squad statistics

! colspan="13" style="background:#FFDE00; text-align:center" | Goalkeepers
|-

! colspan="13" style="background:#FFDE00; color:black; text-align:center;"| Defenders
|-

! colspan="13" style="background:#FFDE00; color:black; text-align:center;"| Midfielders
|-

! colspan="13" style="background:#FFDE00; color:black; text-align:center;"| Forwards
|-

! colspan="13" style="background:#FFDE00; color:black; text-align:center;"| Left during Winter Transfer Window
|-

|-
|}

Disciplinary record

|-
! colspan="20" style="background:#FFDE00; text-align:center" | Goalkeepers

|-
! colspan="20" style="background:#FFDE00; color:black; text-align:center;"| Defenders

|-
! colspan="20" style="background:#FFDE00; color:black; text-align:center;"| Midfielders

|-
! colspan="20" style="background:#FFDE00; color:black; text-align:center;"| Forwards

|-
! colspan="20" style="background:#FFDE00; color:black; text-align:center;"| Left during Winter Transfer window

|-
|}

Starting 11

References

External links
AEK Athens F.C. Official Website

1999-2000
Greek football clubs 1999–2000 season